The Hainan Island shrew (Crocidura wuchihensis) is a species of mammal in the family Soricidae native to China and Vietnam. The IUCN has insufficient data to assess the level of population and its trend.

Distribution and habitat
The Hainan Island shrew is known from Hainan Island in China and from northern Vietnam where it is present on Mount Tay Con Linh II in Ha Giang Province.

References

Crocidura
Mammals described in 1966